Ty Darlington (born December 3, 1994) is an American football coach and former center who is currently the tight ends coach at Incarnate Word. He played college football at Oklahoma, where he was a two-time Academic All-American and won both the Wuerffel Trophy and William V. Campbell Trophy in his senior season.

Playing career

College 
Darlington committed to playing college football at Oklahoma in 2011, a school that he grew up a fan of as his mother was a cheerleader for the Sooners. While at Oklahoma, he took part in a number of activities, where he was a leader of a Fellowship of Christian Athletes group, a vice chairman on the Student-Athletes Advisory Committee at OU, and a team captain for football. He was also a stellar student-athlete, compiling a 3.91 cumulative GPA while at Oklahoma, the only non-A he received being a B in a strength & conditioning course. As a senior, he racked up awards, being named the recipient of the William V. Campbell Trophy, an award that considered the student-athlete equivalent of the Heisman Trophy and the Wuerffel Trophy, an award given to the player who combines community service with athletics and academics. He was also named to the 2015 All-Big 12 Conference first-team.

Professional 
Darlington signed a professional contract with the Tennessee Titans after going undrafted in 2016, but did not make the team. He retired from professional football shortly after and joined the athletics department at his alma mater Oklahoma as an administrative fellow and for Sooner Sports TV.

Coaching career 
Darlington joined the Oklahoma coaching staff in 2017 as an offensive quality control coach. He was reassigned to a graduate assistant role in 2020.

References

External links 
 
 Oklahoma profile
 National Football Foundation profile

1994 births
Living people
People from Apopka, Florida
Players of American football from Florida
Coaches of American football from Florida
American football centers
Oklahoma Sooners football players
Tennessee Titans players
Oklahoma Sooners football coaches